A Winner Never Quits is a 1986 television film based on the true story of baseball player Pete Gray, the first one-armed man ever to play major league baseball, hired in 1943 as a "freak attraction" and wartime morale-booster by the Memphis Chicks, Class-A minor league ball club.

Though a success, Gray maintains a tough, defensive veneer, which is softened only by the love of his life Annie and the adulation of baseball fan Nelson Gary Jr., who has also lost an arm (and who would, in real life, become a top minor-league ballplayer himself). With the war depleting big-league baseball's manpower in 1945, Pete Gray finally achieves his goal of entering the Majors when he is hired by the St. Louis Browns.

Plot

Raised in the Northeastern Pennsylvania mining town of Nanticoke, Pete Gray loses his right arm while still a young boy. But through the encouragement of his immigrant parents, Antoinette and Peter Wyshner Sr., and the constant coaching of his older brother Whitey, Gray never gives up on his dream of playing professional baseball. Driven by anger, he finally makes it to the big leagues. But it isn't until he agrees to meet handicapped youngster Nelson Gary Jr., who idolizes him, that Gray finally comes to terms with several life realizations.

Cast

Home media
A Winner Never Quits was released on VHS on August 18, 1993, by Columbia Tri-Star.

External links

1986 television films
1986 films
1980s biographical drama films
1980s sports films
American baseball films
American biographical drama films
Films about amputees
Sports films based on actual events
Films directed by Mel Damski
Cultural depictions of baseball players
Biographical films about sportspeople
ABC Motion Pictures films
Films set in 1943
Films set in 1945
St. Louis Browns
Columbia Pictures films
1980s American films